The Gift of the Gods Championship was a professional wrestling championship promoted by Lucha Underground. Unlike most traditional professional wrestling championships, the Gift of the Gods Championship is promoted by what it grants the champion instead of being the main prize in itself; holding the Gift of the Gods Championship entitles the champion to a match for the Lucha Underground Championship at a time of their choosing, provided they give a one-week notice to properly promote such a high-profile match. The concept is similar to the WWE Money in the Bank contract that also grants a title match at the winner's option, but unlike Money in the Bank, it does not allow for an immediate championship match. If the Gift of the Gods champion redeems the championship for a Lucha Underground Championship match, the medallions are removed and redistributed to determine the competitors for the now vacant title.

As it was a professional wrestling championship, the championship was not won not by actual competition, but by a scripted ending to a match determined by the bookers and match makers. On occasion the promotion declares a championship vacant, which means there is no champion at that point in time. This can either be due to a storyline, or real life issues such as a champion suffering an injury being unable to defend the championship, or leaving the company.

Background

In season 1, episode 27 ("Ancient Medallions") Dario Cueto, the storyline owner of Lucha Underground, revealed that he had gathered seven ancient Aztec medallions during a taped segment. He explained that they represented the seven tribes of the ancient Aztec world and that whoever held all seven of them would gain a "gift from the gods". Later on he ordered seven wrestlers to come to the ring; Cage, Fénix, Killshot, King Cuerno, Pentagón Jr, Sexy Star and Willie Mack. The winner of the seven-way match would win the first of seven medallions. Fénix won the match and the first of the medallions. In episode 30 ("Submit to the Master") Cueto announced that Jack Evans and Argenis would wrestle for the second of the medallions in a match that Jack Evans won. Episodes showing how the remaining five medallions were awarded has not yet aired, but reports from the taping of the final match revealed that Aero Star, Bengala, Big Ryck, King Cuerno and Sexy Star win the remaining medallions at some point prior to episode 39 Ultima Lucha. During Ultima Lucha Cueto revealed that the seven medallions all slotted into a wrestling championship called the "Gift of the Gods Championship", which would grant the champion a match for the Lucha Underground Championship any time they wanted, provided they gave Cueto a week's notice so he could promote the match. Fénix outlasted the other six competitors and won the Gift of the Gods Championship After the Gift of the Gods Champion is vacated to challenge for the Lucha Underground Championship, the medallions are redistributed among the roster and the seven winners face off to determine a new champion.

Title history

Combined reigns

Notes

References

External links
 Gift Of The Gods Championship

Lucha Underground championships